Daniel Taylor Vogelbach (born December 17, 1992) is an American professional baseball designated hitter for the New York Mets of Major League Baseball (MLB). He has previously played in MLB for the Seattle Mariners, Toronto Blue Jays, Milwaukee Brewers, and Pittsburgh Pirates.

Vogelbach was born and raised in the Fort Myers, Florida area where he attended Bishop Verot High School and played varsity baseball. He passed on his commitment to play college baseball for the University of Florida when he was drafted in the second round of the 2011 MLB draft by the Chicago Cubs. After spending multiple seasons in the Cubs farm system, Vogelbach was traded to the Mariners in July 2016 and made his MLB debut with them two months later.

Between 2016 and 2018, Vogelbach received sporadic playing time at the major league level and was frequently sent down to the minor leagues. In 2019, Vogelbach set a career-high 144 games played and received an All-Star selection for his contributions at first base and as designated hitter. After starting the shortened 2020 season batting .094, Vogelbach was designated for assignment by the Mariners. He played a brief two-game stint with the Blue Jays before finishing out the 2020 season with the Brewers and remaining with the team for the 2021 season. Vogelbach signed with the Pirates as a free agent in 2022 and was traded to the Mets midway through the season.

Amateur career
Vogelbach attended Bishop Verot High School in Fort Myers, Florida. He committed to play college baseball at the University of Florida. As a senior in high school, he had a .551 batting average with nine home runs and was The News-Press All-Area Baseball Player of the Year.

Professional career

Chicago Cubs
The Chicago Cubs selected Vogelbach in the second round of the 2011 MLB draft. He made his professional debut with the Arizona League Cubs. In six games, he had a .292 average with one home run in 24 at bats. In 2012, Vogelbach started the season with the Arizona League Cubs and was promoted to the Boise Hawks during the season. He finished the season with a slash line of .322/.410/.641 with 17 home runs and 62 runs batted in over 245 at bats in 61 games. In 2013, Vogelbach started the season with the Kane County Cougars and was promoted to the Daytona Cubs near the end of the season. He finished the year with a .284/.375/.449 slash line with 19 home runs over 483 at bats in 131 games.

In 2014, he batted .268 for the Daytona Cubs. After the season, Cubs added him to their 40-man roster. He played for the Tennessee Smokies of the Class AA Southern League in 2015.

In 2016, Vogelbach began the season with the Iowa Cubs of the Class AAA Pacific Coast League (PCL).

Seattle Mariners

On July 20, 2016, the Cubs traded Vogelbach and Paul Blackburn to the Seattle Mariners for Mike Montgomery and Jordan Pries. The Mariners assigned him to the Tacoma Rainiers of the PCL, and promoted him to the major leagues on September 12, after the Rainiers were eliminated from the PCL postseason. He made his major-league debut later that night as a pinch-hitter against the Los Angeles Angels, grounding into a fielder's choice in his first at bat. The next night, he got the first start and first hit of his MLB career, recording a single to right in his third plate appearance. In 2016, he accrued a .083/.154/.183 slash line in 8 games.

In 2017, when playing for the Tacoma Rainiers, Vogelbach hit .290 with 17 home runs and 83 RBI. Vogelbach also participated in the Triple-A home run derby. He made it all the way to the final round before finally losing to Bryce Brentz of the Pawtucket Red Sox. In August 2017, Vogelbach was called up to the major leagues. He was used for the remainder of the season as a pinch hitter and back-up first baseman, as the Mariners already had Yonder Alonso and Danny Valencia covering first base duties. In MLB during 2017, he slashed .214/.290/.250 in 28 at bats.

On March 25, 2019, the Mariners announced that Vogelbach had made their Opening Day roster. In 2019, he had a slash line of .208/.341/.439 with 30 home runs and 76 RBIs. He was thrown the highest percentage of curveballs of all American League batters (13.2%), and swung at the lowest percentage of all pitches of all major league batters (34.1%). Vogelbach represented the Mariners in the 2019 MLB All-Star Game on July 9.

On August 19, 2020, Vogelbach was designated for assignment by the Mariners after he began the season batting 5-for-53 (.094) in 18 games. Overall in parts of five seasons with Seattle, Vogelbach batted .196 with 36 home runs and 95 RBIs in 223 games.

Toronto Blue Jays
On August 23, 2020, the Toronto Blue Jays acquired Vogelbach for cash considerations. On September 1, 2020, Vogelbach was designated for assignment by the Blue Jays. At the time of his designation, Vogelbach only had 4 hitless at-bats for the Blue Jays.

Milwaukee Brewers
On September 3, 2020, Vogelbach was claimed off waivers by the Milwaukee Brewers. In 19 games with the 2020 Brewers, Vogelbach slashed .328/.418/.569 with four home runs. He returned to the Brewers for 2021. On June 23, he was placed on the 10-day injured list with a hamstring strain, was transferred to the 60-day injured list on August 22, and was activated on September 1. For the 2021 season, he slashed .219/.349/.381 with 9 home runs and 24 RBIs in 93 games. On November 30, Vogelbach was non-tendered by the Brewers, making him a free agent.

Pittsburgh Pirates
On March 15, 2022, Vogelbach signed a one-year contract with a team option for a second year with the Pittsburgh Pirates. On May 17, Vogelbach hit the first triple of his career off of Keegan Thompson of the Chicago Cubs. In 75 games with the Pirates, he batted .228 with 12 home runs and 34 RBIs.

New York Mets
On July 22, 2022, the Pirates traded Vogelbach to the New York Mets for Colin Holderman. He made his first appearance with the Mets on July 24, going 1-for-3 with a walk. On August 3, 2022 Vogelbach hit his first home run as a Met, a grand slam off of Washington Nationals reliever Jordan Weems in Nationals Park, becoming the 11th Mets player to hit a grand slam as his first homerun with the team. In November, the Mets exercised their option with him for the 2023 season.

References

External links

1992 births
Living people
American League All-Stars
American people of German descent
Arizona League Cubs players
Baseball players from Florida
Boise Hawks players
Daytona Cubs players
Iowa Cubs players
Kane County Cougars players
Major League Baseball designated hitters
Major League Baseball first basemen
Mesa Solar Sox players
Milwaukee Brewers players
Nashville Sounds players
New York Mets players
Pittsburgh Pirates players
People from North Fort Myers, Florida
Seattle Mariners players
Tacoma Rainiers players
Tennessee Smokies players
Toronto Blue Jays players